Hariri Pontarini Architects is a Toronto-based architectural practice founded by Siamak Hariri and David Pontarini.

Established in 1994, HPA’s first critically acclaimed project was for McKinsey & Company's Toronto headquarters, which became one of the youngest buildings to be designated with Heritage Status by the City of Toronto.
Most of the firm's work is in Canada, mainly in Toronto.

Select completed projects
 2019: Massey Tower, Toronto, Ontario, Canada
 2019: Rankin Family Pavilion, Brock University, St. Catharines, Ontario, Canada
 2018: One Bloor, Toronto, Ontario, Canada
 2018: Essex Centre of Research, University of Windsor, Ontario, Canada
 2017: Casey House, Toronto, Ontario, Canada 
 2016: Baháʼí Temple for South America, Santiago, Chile
2016: Jackman Law Building, University of Toronto Faculty of Law, Toronto, Ontario, Canada (with B+H Architects)
2016: Bahá'í Temple for South America, Santiago, Chile
2013: The Richard Ivey Building, Ivey Business School at Western University
2012: Shangri-La Toronto Hotel and Residences
2012: Bloor Cinema, Toronto, Ontario, Canada
2011: Michael G. DeGroote School of Medicine, McMaster University, Hamilton, Ontario, Canada
2010: The Weston Family Learning Centre, Art Gallery of Ontario (AGO), Toronto, Ontario, Canada
2010: The Ontario Pavilion for the 2010 Vancouver Winter Olympics, British Columbia, Canada
2009: Max Gluskin House, Department of Economics University of Toronto, Ontario, Canada
2008: School of Pharmacy, University of Waterloo, Ontario, Canada
2006: Ravine Residence, Toronto, Ontario, Canada
2004: Camera + Stephen Bulger Gallery, Queen Street West Toronto, Ontario, Canada
2004: Art Collectors' Residence, Toronto, Ontario, Canada
2003: The Seymour Schulich Building, Schulich School of Business, York University, Toronto, Ontario, Canada
2001: MacLaren Art Centre, Barrie, Ontario, Canada
1999: McKinsey & Co. Toronto, Ontario, Canada
1998: Robertson House Crisis Care Centre, Toronto, Ontario, Canada

Work in progress

 Tom Patterson Theatre, Stratford Festival, Stratford, Ontario, Canada
 Nicol Building, Sprott School of Business, Carleton University, Ottawa, Ontario, Canada
 Pinnacle One Yonge, Toronto, Ontario, Canada
 The Well, Toronto, Ontario, Canada
 19 Duncan Street, Toronto, Ontario, Canada
 PJ Condos, Toronto, Ontario, Canada

Select awards 
Hariri Pontarini Architects has been honoured with numerous national and international awards, including the 2013 Royal Architectural Institute of Canada's Architectural Firm Award. 

 2020 Governor General's Medal in Architecture for the Baháʼí Temple of South America
 2019 Royal Architectural Institute of Canada's International Prize 
 2019 American Institute of Architects Healthcare Design Award for Casey House
 2018 Governor General's Medal in Architecture for Casey House
 2017 American Institute of Architects Innovation Award for the Baháʼí Temple of South America
 2017 Royal Architectural Institute of Canada's Innovation in Architecture Award for the Baháʼí Temple of South America
 2016 Ontario Association of Architects Lieutenant Governor's Award for Design Excellence in Architecture for the Richard Ivey School of Business
 2006 Governor General's Medal in Architecture for the Schulich School of Business at York University

See also
 Architecture of Toronto

References

External links 
 

Architecture firms of Canada
Companies based in Toronto
1994 establishments in Ontario